The Cuban grassquit (Phonipara canora) is a small bird in the tanager family Thraupidae. It is endemic to Cuba.

Its natural habitats are subtropical or tropical moist lowland forest, subtropical or tropical moist montane forest, subtropical or tropical dry shrubland, and heavily degraded former forest.

Taxonomy
The Cuban grassquit was formally described in 1789 by the German naturalist Johann Friedrich Gmelin under the binomial name Loxia canora. He based his description on the "Brown Cheeked Grosbeak" that had been described by Peter Brown in 1776. Brown's illustration was from a live bird belonging to Marmaduke Tunstall which Brown mistakenly believed had come from Mexico. It only occurs in Cuba. This species was formerly placed in the genus Tiaris, but a molecular phylogenetic study published in 2014 found that Tiaris was polyphyletic. In the resulting reorganization, the Cuban grassquit was moved to the resurrected genus Phonipara that had been introduced in 1850 by the French naturalist Charles Lucien Bonaparte. The genus name combines the Ancient Greek phōnēs meaning "vocal" with the Latin parus meaning "tit". The specific epithet conora is from Latin canorus meaning "melodious". The Cuban grassquit is monotypic: no subspecies are recognised.

Although traditionally placed with the buntings and New World sparrows in the family Emberizidae, molecular genetic studies have shown that the Cuban grassquit is a member of the subfamily Coerebinae within the tanager family Thraupidae.

References

External links
 Xeno-canto: audio recordings of the Cuban grassquit

Cuban grassquit
Birds of Cuba
Cuban grassquit
Cuban grassquit
Taxonomy articles created by Polbot